Kahini (Bengali: কাহিনী; English: Tales) is a Bengali poetry book written by Rabindranath Tagore. It was published in 1900. It consists of 8 remarkable poems. These poems are reused in his another poetry collection "Katha O Kahini".

List of Poems 
The poems of "Kahini" are: 

 Kato Ki Je Ashe 
 Gaanbhanga 
 Puratan Bhritya 
 Dui Bigha Jomi
 Debatar Gras 
 Nishphal Upahar
 Dinadaan 
 Bisarjon

References

External links 

 rabindra-rachanabali.nltr.org

1900 poetry books
Bengali poetry collections
Poetry collections by Rabindranath Tagore
Indian_poetry_books